Blaine Wilhour is a Republican member of the Illinois House of Representatives from the 107th district. The district, located in Southern Illinois, includes all or portions of Bond, Clinton, Effingham, Fayette, and Marion counties.

Wilhour, of Beecher City, defeated David J. Seiler, a history teacher at Lake Land College, in the 2018 general election. He is a past member of the Fayette County Board and veteran of the Illinois Army National Guard. He works at his family's construction company and its farm.

In the aftermath of the storming of the Capitol by a mob of Trump supporters, Wilhour condemned the violence and the rioters but expressed sympathy with the reason for the protests. Wilhour supported Mary Miller's objections to certifying Joe Biden's electoral victory, falsely claiming there was "irregularities" in the 2020 election.

As of July 3, 2022, Representative Wilhour was a member of the following Illinois House committees:

 Appropriations - Elementary & Secondary Education Committee (HAPE)
 Energy & Environment Committee (HENG)
 Ethics & Elections Committee (SHEE)
 Labor & Commerce Committee (HLBR)
 Personnel & Pensions Committee (HPPN)
 Prescription Drug Affordability Committee (HPDA)
 Transportation: Vehicles & Safety Committee (HVES)
 Wage Policy & Study Subcommittee (HLBR-WAGE)

Electoral history

References

External links
 Representative Blaine Wilhour (R) 107th District, 101st
 Citizens For Blaine Wilhour official campaign website

21st-century American politicians
Republican Party members of the Illinois House of Representatives
County board members in Illinois
Farmers from Illinois
Illinois National Guard personnel
People from Fayette County, Illinois
Living people
1982 births